The .32-40 Ballard (also called .32-40 Winchester) is an American rifle cartridge.

Description
Introduced in 1884, the .32-40 was developed as a black powder match-grade round for the Ballard single-shot Union Hill Nos. 8 and 9 target rifles. It was available in Winchester and Marlin lever-action rifles beginning in 1886. It and the .38-55 were chambered for the Model 1894 Winchester when it came out in 1894. It stopped being a factory chambering around 1940.

It can be used for varmint and predator hunting, including coyotes and wolves. H. V. Stent has said that for a time the .32-40 and .38-55 were considered by some hunters to be usable for moose and elk at woods ranges, but sales of the Model 1894 in 30 WCF (.30-30), a cartridge introduced a year later, soon outpaced the two because of its higher speed, higher energy, and flatter trajectory. 

More recently, the .32-40 in a Model 1894 built in 1905 was successfully used by John Royer, from Pennsylvania, to show that it can still be used on whitetail deer at close range. He wanted to keep the shot within 75 yards. The range at which the .32-40 is suitable for deer is a matter of debate. Its common muzzle energy of <800 ft-lb is equal only to current 150 and 170 grain flat- or round-nose loadings of the .30-30 (in a 20-in barrel) at about 200 yards, which is often considered to be the maximum range of the .30-30.

The .32-40 also served as the basis for Harry Pope's wildcat .33-40.

See also
8 mm caliber
List of cartridges by caliber
List of rifle cartridges

References

Sources
Barnes, Frank C., ed. by John T. Amber. Cartridges of the World (Northfield, IL: DBI Books, 1972),

Pistol and rifle cartridges